Varsoda is a small village located in Mansa, Gujarat, on the bank of the Sabarmati River, formerly the seat of an eponymous Rajput princely state.

History 

Varsoda (or Varsora) was a Hindu princely state in Mahi Kantha with an area of 28 square kilometers km2 (11 square miles) before Indian Independence (1947). It had a population of 4,051 in 1892, 3,656 in 1901, yielding 18,871 rupees sate revenue (1903-4, mainly from land), and paying 1,583 rupees tribute to the Gaekwar Baroda State.

Rulers 
 Thakur Gambhirsinhji
 Thakur Motisinhji -/1858
 Thakur Kishorsinhji Motisinhji, born 15 October 1840, succeeded 4 March 1858, died 18 July 1919
 Thakur Joravarsinhji, born 17 April 1914 and succeeded 18 July 1919. The state ceased to exist on 10 June 1948 by accession to Bombay State.

References

External links and sources 
 Imperial Gazetteer, o DSAL - Mahi Kantha

Villages in Gandhinagar district